Shipitsyno is an urban locality (an urban-type settlement) in Kotlassky District of Arkhangelsk Oblast, Russia, located on the left bank of the Northern Dvina River  from Kotlas. Municipally, it is the administrative center of Shipitsynskoye Urban Settlement, one of the three urban settlements in the district. Population: .

History
Shipitsyno was granted urban-type settlement status in 1950.

Economy

Industry
There is a number of industrial enterprises in Shipitsyno, including the timber industry, concrete production, and mechanical works.

Transportation
There is a river harbor in Shipitsyno, and the Northern Dvina is navigable, but there is no passenger navigation.

Shipitsyno is located on the road connecting Kotlas and Bereznik via Krasnoborsk. There is a regular bus service on the road; additionally, there is passenger bus traffic from Kotlas which ends in Shipitsyno.

References

Notes

Sources

Urban-type settlements in Arkhangelsk Oblast
Populated places in Kotlassky District